Nez Perce may refer to:

A people and their customs 
 Nez Perce people, Native American people living in the Pacific Northwest region of the United States
 Nez Perce language, their language
 Nez Perce War, an 1877 war between the Nez Perce tribe and U.S. Government

Geographical locations 
 Nez Perce Traditional Site, Wallowa Lake, a Nez Perce cemetery near Joseph, Oregon
 Nez Perce County, Idaho, a county in Idaho
 Nezperce, Idaho, a city in Lewis County, Idaho
 Nez Perce National Forest, a U.S. National Forest in Idaho
 Nez Perce Peak, a mountain in Grand Teton Nation Park
 Nez Perce Pass, a mountain pass in the Bitterroot mountains of Idaho and Montana
 Fort Nez Percés, a fur trading post in Washington Territory

Historical locations 
 Nez Perce National Historical Park, a multi-state U.S. National Historic Park
 Nez Perce National Historic Trail, a trail commemorating the Nez Perce War

Nomenclature using Nez Perce 
 Nez Perce Chief (sternwheeler), an 1860–1870s steamboat operating on the Columbia River
 The Nez Perce, a Douglas C-47 transport aircraft that was converted into a glider
 Nez Percé Stake Race, a type of competitive speed event for horses said to be inspired by the Nez Perce tribe
 Nez Perce Horse, a breed of horse used by the Nez Perce tribe

See also 
 Nez (disambiguation)

Language and nationality disambiguation pages